This is a list of civil parishes in the ceremonial county of Dorset, England. There are 269 civil parishes.

Bournemouth, Christchurch and Poole 

The former Bournemouth County Borough was mostly unparished and the former Poole Municipal Borough was entirely unparished.

Dorset 
The former Weymouth and Melcombe Regis Municipal Borough was unparished.
Population figures are unavailable for some of the smallest parishes.

See also
 List of civil parishes in England

References

External links
 Office for National Statistics : Geographical Area Listings

Civil parishes
Dorset
 
Civil parishes